Philip Morris Operations or Niš Tobacco Factory is a Serbian tobacco manufacturer based in Niš.

History

The Niš Tobacco Factory was established in 1930 as a part of the state tobacco monopoly at its present location in Crveni Krst neighborhood of Niš. It was one of the largest cigarette manufacturers in Yugoslavia. It offered a variety of services, including the production of  processed tobacco, tobacco cut filler, filters and other.

During the 1990s, Niš Tobacco Factory had 3,500 employees and had tens of thousands cooperators in former Yugoslavia. In 1999, during the NATO bombing of Yugoslavia, the company's facilities were bombed, allegedly by request of Philip Morris International.

Niš Tobacco Factory was sold to Philip Morris in August 2003 for 518 million euros. It later changed the name to Philip Morris Operations. In 2012, workers union protested, stating that Philip Morris has never transferred 387 million euros to the Government of Serbia and also greatly reduced production.

Market and financial data
As of 19 December 2018, Philip Morris Operations has a market capitalization of 97.20 million euros.

See also 

 Morava (cigarette)

References

External links
 
 Philip Morris Operations 

1930 establishments in Serbia
2003 mergers and acquisitions
Companies based in Niš
Manufacturing companies established in 1930
Philip Morris International
Serbian brands
Tobacco companies of Serbia